The 1988 Washington gubernatorial election was held on November 8, 1988. Incumbent Democratic Governor Booth Gardner won his second term over Republican State Representative Bob Williams in a landslide. , this was the most recent Washington gubernatorial election in which both candidates are now deceased.

Blanket primary

Candidates

Democratic
Booth Gardner, incumbent Governor of Washington
Jeanne Dixon
Richard "Onery Dick" Short
Ted Parker Fix

Republican
Bob Williams, state representative
Norm Maleng, King County prosecutor

Independent
Baba Jeanne "BJ" Mangaoang, party leader

Results

General election

Candidates
Booth Gardner (D), incumbent Governor of Washington
Bob Williams (R), state representative

Debates 
Complete video of debate, October 30, 1988 - C-SPAN

Results

References

1988
1988 United States gubernatorial elections
Gubernatorial